The Río Blanco is a river in Honduras.  This flows northwards through San Pedro Sula and empties its waters into the Ulúa River.

See also
List of rivers of Honduras

References
Rand McNally, The New International Atlas, 1993.
CIA map: :Image:Honduras rel 1985.jpg
UN map: :Image:Un-honduras.png
Google Maps

Rivers of Honduras
San Pedro Sula